Begunia is a Vidhan Sabha constituency of Khordha district, Odisha, India. This constituency includes Begunia block and Bologarh block.

Begunia is a block town of Khordha district of the Indian state of Odisha. The distance from district headquarters is 18 km.

Elected Members

Fourteen elections were held between 1957 and 2014.
Elected members from the Begunia constituency are:
2019: (116): Rajendra Kumar Sahoo (BJD)
2014: (116): Prasanta Kumar Jagadev (BJD)
2009: (116): Prashanta Nanda NCP
2004: (60): Janaki Ballabh Patnaik (Congress)
2000: (60): Prashanta Nanda (BJP
1995: (60):Harihara Sahoo (Congress)
1990: (60): Surendranath Mishra Janata Dal)
1985: (60): Kailash Chandra Mohapatra (Congress)
1981: (60): Kailash Chandra Mohapatra (Congress-I)
1977: (60): Chintamani Panigrahi (Congress)
1974: (60): Satyananda Champatiray (UTC)
1971: (56): Gangadhar Paikaray (CPI)
1967: (56): Gangadhar Paikaray (CPI)
1961: (86): Gangadhar Paikaray (CPI)
1957: (59): Satyananda Champatiray (Congress)
1952: Gangadhar Paikaray (CPI)

2019 Election Result

2014 Election Result

2009 Election Results
In 2009 election, Nationalist Congress Party candidate Prashanta Nanda defeated Indian National Congress candidate Pradeep Kumar Sahoo by a margin of 10,617 votes.

Notes

References

Assembly constituencies of Odisha
Khordha district